Vladivostok 2000 (ex-Damanzaihao) is the world's largest fish factory ship with a mass of 49,367 tons  and 228 meters in length.

Since July 2019, the vessel is Russia-flagged, owned by Pacific Marine Trawlers Ltd and operated by Dalmoreprodukt, both located at Vladivostok.

Previously the ship was sailing under flag of Belize and was owned by Peru-based Pacific Andes and 'Sustainable Fishing Resources', a subsidiary of the conglomerate China Fishery Group, which filed for bankruptcy in the United States on 30 June 2016.

The ship was built in 1980 as an oil tanker for a Norwegian company, and was christened Freeport Chief, since then, it has been renamed Dorsetshire (1990), Protank Orinoco (1991), Vemacape (2009), Lafayette (2014) and lastly, Damanzaihao. In 2008 the vessel was converted to a fish factory ship in a Chinese shipyard.

Illegal fishing
In 2014, the South Pacific Regional Fisheries Management Organisation (SPRFMO) put Damanzaihao on a draft list of illegal, unreported and unregulated fishing (IUU) vessels —bureaucratic speak for a pirate fishing boat. following a review, its listing was confirmed in 2015 and fined $800,000 which remains unpaid.

The ship was detained by agents from the Peruvian Environmental Prosecutor's Office on 30 May 2018 following additional allegations of illegal fishing and pollution of Chimbote Bay in Peru. Sea Shepherd Conservation Society's  vessel operated in Peruvian waters to investigate and gather information to assist the government.

See also
Environmental crime
Fishing industry in China
Flag of convenience 
Illegal, unreported and unregulated fishing (IUU)

References

External links
Damanzaihao - Timeline of names, owners, operators, and flags

Fish processing
Fishing in China
1980 ships
Factory ships